Jaroslav Černý (born 26 June 1979 in Horní Benešov) is a Czech football midfielder. He notably played for Ankaragücü or Senica.
.

References

External links
 
 Jaroslav Černý stats and photos at Slavia Prague homepage
 

1979 births
Living people
Czech footballers
Czech Republic international footballers
Czech expatriate footballers
SFC Opava players
FC Zbrojovka Brno players
SK Sigma Olomouc players
SK Slavia Prague players
SK Dynamo České Budějovice players
MKE Ankaragücü footballers
FK Senica players
Czech First League players
Slovak Super Liga players
Süper Lig players
Expatriate footballers in Turkey
Expatriate footballers in Slovakia
Czech expatriate sportspeople in Slovakia
Czech expatriate sportspeople in Turkey
Association football midfielders